Vladimir Borisovich Belov  (born January 7, 1972), known as The Khovrinsky Maniac, is a Soviet-Russian brigand and serial killer, who received his nickname because he committed most of his crimes in the Khovrino District.

Biography
Belov was born in 1972 in Moscow. He received his first term for theft. Freed in 1991, he soon committed a robbery, which ended in murder. On February 4, 1993, Belov was sentenced to 15 years in the Ulyanovsk prison. There he met his future accomplice, Sergei Aleksandrovich Shabanov (b. 1977), also a Moscow native. In 2001, Belov was released on parole, and Shabanov was released three years earlier, also on parole.

The first murder of the duo was committed when Belov's friend Shabanov requested that they kill the merchant Alexander Cheresimov. For 500 dollars, both of them shot him on October 15, 2001. On December 26, on Festivalnoy Street in Moscow, Belov killed a woman who was returning from work. He stole a bag, purse, earrings, money, and a cake from the deceased, which he carried home. The total value of the items was about 3000 rubles. On January 25, 2002, Belov and Shabanov killed another woman, a citizen of Austria, in a deserted yard on Zelenogradskaya Street. Like the previous victim, they stole her bag. The next attack by Belov and Shabanov was carried out on the evening of February 10 on Vyborgskaya Street with the same motives and method, this time stealing 100 rubles and a mobile phone, but the victim miraculously survived. After that attack, all criminal cases were combined into one, and the Interdistrict Investigative Brigade became engaged in it. The survivor helped make a facial composite, and the image was pasted all over Moscow and shown on television. However, the criminals were not caught, and the crimes increased. On February 20, a new murder occurred. On February 22, at a house near Klinskaya Street, Belov and Shabanov killed another woman. The next attack occurred on February 27 near Cherepanovs' Passage, with Belov hitting the victim with a baseball bat, but she furiously resisted and forced him to flee. Just a few hours later, on Lyapidevsky Street, Belov and Shabanov killed their final victim.

Belov and Shabanov were not afraid of being caught: they drove to the crime scene by car, without fearing that someone could remember their number. They committed their crimes against middle-income people, but sometimes there were no more than 3 rubles in the victims' bags. Both got used to murdering, as Belov later said: "After the first corpse, it's hard to sleep, then you get used to it." By that time, the whole of Moscow was talking about Khovrinsky Maniac, especially the frightened residents of the Northern Administrative District. The first surviving victim gave a detailed description of the brigand, from which the investigative brigadiers found out it was the twice-before convicted felon Vladimir Belov.

Arrest, trial and sentence 
Belov, who saw that they were coming to arrest him, jumped out of the second story window, got into his Opel Vectra and disappeared. However, he and Shabanov were arrested a day later, and immediately gave testimony. Belov confessed to all the murders in which he was accused, and at the same time, tried to minimize his role in the crimes. At one of the interrogations, Belov said that if he was ever released, he would kill again. "I can not do anything else," he complained to the investigator.

Belov and Shabanov were recognized as sane. On December 10, 2003, the Moscow City Court sentenced Vladimir Belov to life imprisonment and Shabanov to 20 years imprisonment. The Supreme Court of Russia upheld the verdict of Belov without changes, and he was sent to the "Black Berkut" colony in the Sverdlovsk Oblast.

Subsequently, in 2005, another trial took place, in which Belov and Shabanov were found guilty of as many as 10 attacks, one of which, committed on October 16, 2001, ended in murder. Shabanov was resentenced to 21 years in prison, and Belov's sentence remained unchanged. The exact number of victims of the Khovrinsky Maniac and his accomplice is still unknown. According to an investigator, about 80 victims belong to Belov and Shabanov, but the court found them guilty of only committing 7 murders.

In the media 
 Documentary film "Khovrinsky Maniac" from the series by Vakhtang Mikeladze Documentary Detective
 Documentary film "He killed only women" from the series by Vakhtang Mikeladze Sentenced for life
 Documentary film "The Man with a Bat in His Hands" from the series by Vakhtang Mikeladze Lifelessly Deprived of liberty

See also
 List of Russian serial killers

References 

1972 births
Living people
Male serial killers
Outlaws
Russian serial killers
Thieves